Cychrus uenoi is a species of ground beetle in the subfamily of Carabinae. It was described by Imura in 1995.

References

uenoi
Beetles described in 1995